This is a list of winners and nominees for the BAFTA Award for Best Sound, which is presented to sound designers, sound editors, sound engineers, and sound mixers, given out by the British Academy of Film and Television Arts since 1969.

Winners and nominees

1960s
Best Soundtrack

1970s

1980s
Best Sound

1990s

2000s

2010s

2020s

See also
 Academy Award for Best Sound
 Academy Award for Best Sound Editing
 Critics' Choice Movie Award for Best Sound
 Golden Reel Award for Outstanding Achievement in Sound Editing – Dialogue and ADR for Feature Film
 Cinema Audio Society Award for Outstanding Achievement in Sound Mixing for a Motion Picture – Live Action
 Golden Reel Award for Outstanding Achievement in Sound Editing – Sound Effects and Foley for Feature Film

References

External links
 

British Academy Film Awards
 
Film sound awards